The 9 Marine Infantry Brigade is a light armoured, amphibious unit of the Troupes de marine of the French Army.

In July 1963, the 9 Brigade was created in Brittany. On 1 January 1976, the 9th Brigade became the 9th Marine Infantry Division (9 division d'Infanterie de Marine, 9 DIMa), attached to the land intervention force, then the Rapid Action Force from 1984. On 1 July 1999, the 9th Marine Infantry Division became the 9th Marine Light Armoured Brigade. On 1 January 2013, the unit was renamed to the 9th Marine Infantry Brigade.

Creation and different nominations 

 1943 - 1947 : creation of the 9th Colonial Infantry Division
 1963 - 1976 : designated as 9th Brigade
 1976 - 1999 : designated as 9th Marine Infantry Division
 1999 - 2013 : designated as 9th Light Armoured Marine Brigade
 2013–present : designated as 9th Marine Infantry Brigade

History 

The division is heir to the Blue Division which fought during the Franco-Prussian War of 1870, in particular during the Battle of Bazeilles and the 9th Colonial Infantry Division, part of the Free French Forces, which distinguished themselves in the apprehending of Elba in June 1944 and the disembarking in Provence on 15 August of the same year. The Division then made way to Indochina, where it was placed dormant (without being dissolved) in December 1947.  

The unit was reactivated in July 1963 in Brittany under the designation of 9th Brigade. On 1 January 1976, the division was baptized as 9th Marine Infantry Division 9e DIMa. Accordingly, the division was attached to the terrestrial intervention force, then the Rapid Action Force (FAR) since 1983. On 1 July 1999, the unit was restructured in a brigade and was designated as 9th Light Armoured Marine Brigade (BLBMa). On 1 January 2013, the brigade was named to the current designation as the 9th Marine Infantry Brigade (9e BIMa).

The headquarter staff is stationed in Poitiers since 1 July 2010. The motto of the brigade is "Semper et Ulbique", Latin for "Always and All over".

The "9th" illustrated capability on all exterior theatres of operations where France has been engaged since World War II: Indochina, Lebanon, Kuwait, Macedonia, Kosovo, Bosnia, Congo, Tchad, Ivory Coast. From October 2010 to May 2011, the Brigade armed essentially Brigade La Fayette in Afghanistan by projecting a headquarter staff ( composed 50% of Marines, Bigors, Marine sapeurs of the 9e BIMa) and the tactical interam groupment of Richelieu armed by the 2nd Marine Infantry Regiment 2e RIMa. In January 2013, elements of the Brigade took part in Operation Serval.

In all combat engagement theatres around the globe, the 9e BIMa illustrated worth of the oldest traditions of the French Troop de Marine.

Missions 

The principal mission of the 9e BIMa, for which the brigade is apt to revolve around:

 Amphibious actions: quick projection of a headquarter staff and one reinforced battalion (1,400 men) by naval amphibious marine means, such as Mistral-class amphibious assault ship.
 Security missions, securitization of urbain oriented combat designated areas.
 Deep decentralization action of search and reconnaissance oriented missions.
 Rapid and deep incursions (armored raids, 100 km range)

The 9e BIMa is present around the globe and also relieves missions of short duration such as in Senegal, Guyana in Mayotte and Djibouti. The 9eBIMa actively participates to missions with the French Navy as the land terrestrial land component of Amphibious groups.

The 9e BIMa is twinned with 3rd Royal Marines Commando Brigade of the Royal Navy. Within this title, from 28 May to 1 June 2012, the center of amphibious operations of the headquarter staff embarked on BPC Mistral with the designated exercise Narval. 10 officers of the headquarter staff of the (twin brigade) participated in light of preparation to exercise Corsican Lion which took place from 17 to 26 October 2012.

Organization 

 9 Compagnie de Commandement et de Transmissions (9 CCT) - Command and Signals Company in Poitiers with VAB
 Régiment d'Infanterie-Chars de Marine (RICM) - Armoured Marine Infantry Regiment (light cavalry) in Poitiers with AMX 10 RC and ERC 90
 1 Régiment d'Infanterie de Marine (1 RIMa) - Armoured Marine Infantry Regiment (light cavalry) in Angoulême with AMX 10 RC and ERC 90
 2 Régiment d'Infanterie de Marine (2 RIMa) - Marine Infantry Regiment in Le Mans with VBCI
 3 Régiment d'Infanterie de Marine (3 RIMa) - Marine Infantry Regiment in Vannes with VAB
 126 Régiment d'Infanterie (126 RI) - Infantry Regiment in Brive-la-Gaillarde with VAB (will be the first unit to receive the new VBMR Griffon in 2018)
 11 Régiment d'Artillerie de Marine (11 RAMa) - Marine Artillery Regiment in Saint-Aubin-du-Cormier with TRF1 howitzers, CAESAR self-propelled howitzers and RTF1 mortars
 6 Régiment du Génie (6 RG) - Engineer Regiment in Angers

Fanfare band 
The brigade maintains a voluntary military band placed under the authority of the commanding general of the 9eBIMa. It was formed in the 1950s and then became the brigade band in July 2003. It was originally based in Dinan and then in Nantes. It is the only voluntary army formation with a bagad. It is officially referred to as the Fanfare et bagad. The band has been led since 1 September 2011 by Warrant Officer Fabrice Zeni. It operates ensembles such as a ceremonial band and a big band.

Brigade Commanders 

2003 - 2005 : Général Jean-Paul Thonier
2005 - 2007 : Général Hervé Charpentier
2007 - 2009 : Général Éric Bonnemaison
2009 - 2011 : Général Jean-François Hogard
2011 - 2013 : Général François Lecointre 
2013 - 2015 : Général Vincent Guionie
2015 - 201x :: Général François Labuze

See also 
French Navy

References

External links 
  
 Page consacrée à la 9e BIMa sur le site du Ministère de la Défense
 Site de la fanfare et du bagad de la 9
 L'ordre de bataille de l'armée de terre 

Brigades of France
Military units and formations established in 1999
Amphibious landing brigades
1999 establishments in France